The Northern Illinois Bluegrass Association (NIBA) is a non-profit organization which promotes and preserves bluegrass music in the northern Illinois (US) area.

History
The NIBA was formed in 1996 as a group of musicians who met weekly to play bluegrass in a barn in Grand Ridge, Illinois. Over time, it developed into a community of musicians and listeners from Illinois, southern Wisconsin, northwestern Indiana and eastern Iowa who share a love of bluegrass music.

Activities
The NIBA organizes and promotes local bluegrass jams and events and participates in the Bluegrass In The Schools program.

The NIBA publishes a newsletter for its members with upcoming event announcements and other bluegrass-related news items.

References

External links
Official website

American bluegrass music groups
Musical groups established in 1996
Musical groups from Illinois

Non-profit organizations based in Illinois